Glen Echo County Club, located in Normandy, Missouri, a St. Louis suburb, is a private golf club that was founded by George McGrew and his son-in-law, Albert Bond Lambert. Completed in 1901, it was the first 18-hole golf course in St. Louis and the first golf course constructed west of the Mississippi River. The course hosted the golf events for the 1904 Summer Olympics.

History
The club was designed by James Foulis from Scotland, winner of the 1896 U.S. Open, and built by him and his brother Robert. It opened on 25 May 1901 and hosted the golf events for the 1904 Summer Olympics. The LPGA Tour visited the course, hosting the St. Louis Women's Invitational in 1954, 1964, and 1970.

Hole information
All information about the holes are from this source.

Other amenities
The course offers a short range tee and a separate recently regrassed to Zoysia Long range. driving range, a chipping green, and a practice bunker. It is a bent grass green with allowance for walking and golf carts on the course. The fairways for the course are Zoysia grass.
Bunkers were renovated in the fall of 2012 Goalby Golf Design and work completed by Glen Echo staff.  Bunkers were modified to the old style flat bottomed bunker.

References

External links
Official website.

Venues of the 1904 Summer Olympics
Olympic golf venues
Golf clubs and courses in Missouri
Buildings and structures in St. Louis County, Missouri